Enallagma dubium is a damselfly in the Coenagrionidae family. It occurs across twelve U.S. states (Alabama, Delaware, Florida, Georgia, Louisiana, Maryland, Mississippi, North Carolina, Oklahoma, South Carolina, Texas, Virginia), and is classified as Least Concern on the  IUCN Red List. E.  dubium was first described in 1924 by Francis Metcalf Root.

References 

Coenagrionidae
Odonata of North America
Insects of the United States
Fauna of the Eastern United States
Least concern biota of the United States
Insects described in 1924